The Central Otago roundhead galaxias (Galaxias anomalus) is a galaxiid of the genus Galaxias, found only in the Taieri and Clutha catchments in Otago, New Zealand. It grows to a length of up to 13 cm.

References

 
 NIWA June 2006

Galaxias
Endemic freshwater fish of New Zealand
Taxa named by Gerald Stokell
Fish described in 1959